Hen Dilmoni (born May 7, 1989), is an Israeli footballer who plays as a left-sided defender for Israeli National League club Maccabi Herzliya.

External links

1989 births
Living people
Israeli footballers
Hapoel Ramat Gan F.C. players
Hakoah Maccabi Amidar Ramat Gan F.C. players
Beitar Tel Aviv Bat Yam F.C. players
Hapoel Ironi Kiryat Shmona F.C. players
Hapoel Kfar Saba F.C. players
Beitar Jerusalem F.C. players
Hapoel Haifa F.C. players
Hapoel Afula F.C. players
Maccabi Herzliya F.C. players
Footballers from Ramat Gan
Liga Leumit players
Israeli Premier League players
Israeli people of Iraqi-Jewish descent
Association football defenders